The 1963 Cupa României Final was the 25th final of Romania's most prestigious football cup competition. It was disputed between Petrolul Ploiești and Siderurgistul Galați, and was won by Petrolul Ploiești after a game with 7 goals. It was the 1st cup for Petrolul Ploiești. One week ago in a championship match against Dinamo Bacău, Petrolul's player Constantin Tabarcea died on the field. In his memory before the Cup final, at the team photo, the place from the down row in front of goalkeeper Mihai Ionescu was left free.

Siderurgistul Galați was the eighth club representing Divizia B which reached the Romanian Cup final.

Match details

See also 
List of Cupa României finals

References

External links
Romaniansoccer.ro

1963
Cupa
Romania